Dumai (Jawi:), is a city in Riau province on the island of Sumatra, Indonesia. The city has an area of 1,727.38 km2 and had 253,803 inhabitants at the 2010 census, 285,448 at the 2015 census and 316,782 at the 2020 census. Dumai has a domestic airport, Pinang Kampai Airport. Dumai is an important transport and trade centre, both regionally and internationally, especially to Malaysia.
Dumai is rich in oil (petroleum and palm oil).

History

Dumai is a city in Riau province, Indonesia, about 188 km from Pekanbaru. Currently Dumai City is the second largest city in the province of Riau, but earlier it was a small hamlet on the east coast of Riau Province. It was inaugurated as a city on 20 April 1999, by Law no. 16 of year 1999, having previously had a town administrative in Bengkalis Regency. At its inception, the City only consisted of three districts, containing 13 urban villages and 9 rural villages, with a population of just 15,699 people and a density of 83.85/km2. It now (2020 census) consists of seven districts.

Administration 
The city is divided into seven districts (kecamatan), tabulated below with their area and their population at the 2010 census and the 2020 census. The table also includes the locations of the district administrative centres, and the number of villages (kelurahan) in each district.

Notes: (a) the 2010 populations of the Dumai Selatan and Dumai Kota Districts are included in the figures for Dumai Barat and Dumai Timur Districts, from which they were cut out in 2009.

The villages (Kelurahan) into which those districts are subdivided are:

 Bukit Kapur, the Villages:
 Bagan Besar
 Bukit Kayu Kapur
 Bukit Nenas
 Gurun Panjang
 Kampung Baru
 Dumai Barat, the Villages:
 Bagan Keladi
 Pangkalan Sesai
 Purnama
 Simpang Tetap Darul Ichsan
 Dumai Timur, the Villages:
 Bukit Batrem
 Buluh Kasap
 Jaya Mukti
 Tanjung Palas
 Teluk Binjai
 Medang Kampai, the Villages:
 Guntung
 Mundam
 Teluk Makmur
 Pelintung
 Sungai Sembilan, the Villages:
 Bangsal Aceh
 Basilam Baru
 Batu Teritip
 Lubuk Gaung
 Tanjung Penyembal
 Dumai Kota, the Villages:
 Laksamana
 Rimba Sekampung
 Bintan
 Dumai Kota
 Sukajadi
 Dumai Selatan, the Villages:
 Bukit Timah
 Mekar Sari
 Bumi Ayu
 Ratu Sima
 Bukit Datuk

Economy
Macro-economic indicators of the gross Regional Domestic Product (GRDP) Dumai increasing each year since 2000–2005 is a picture of the success of the development of economy in Dumai. To support the increase in GDP that heavy economic development point of Dumai is to maintain the dominance of construction on industrial sectors, trade, transport and buildings in addition to paying attention to the agricultural sector as a producer of industrial raw materials. Rapid economic growth rate has also provided job opportunities for people, so that the social welfare in Dumai increases.

Obstacles faced in addition to capital issues is the Status of land still touted ex HPH. Four subdistricts in Dumai District of Sungai Sembilan, Medang Kampai, lime and Western Damai is an area that has the potential of land resources for the development of agribusiness and agro-industries with appropriate technology engineering byocyclo such as rice farming, crops, vegetables, bananas, pineapples, durian, mango, rambutan, palm, cattle (cows, goats, ducks and chickens) as well as the cultivation of farmed freshwater fish (catfish, carp, carp and ornamental fish). more on the produce of the district the river nine to forward is Palm, banana, and crops. Currently the town River nine new basilam village in particular is very deficient means of infra-structures for the construction of the road. Especially the main road construction kaplingan up to the junction with the durian.

Transportation

Land
There are several transportation modes in Pekanbaru such as taxi, bus, oplet (share taxi), bajaj (auto rickshaw), and ojek (motorcycle taxi).
For land transport, Dumai is connected to Trans-Sumatran Highway and Trans-Sumatra Toll Road. Bus services operate to Duri, Padang, Medan, Jambi, Pekanbaru and other cities and regions in Riau Province and Sumatra (Terminal AKAP).

Sea
Dumai Port (Pelabuhan Dumai) is located in Dumai, connecting Dumai with regions in Riau Province, other destinations in Indonesia, and the world. This port is a major port in Riau.

Air
Pinang Kampai Airport is a domestic airport that serves daily flights to/from several cities in Indonesia such as Jakarta, Pekanbaru, Medan, Batam, etc.

Climate
Dumai has a tropical rainforest climate (Af) with heavy rainfall year-round.

Tourism

Dumai is situated on the waterfront has the potential of tourism development such as nature tourism, culture and shopping. Several area attractions including conservation areas in district Nine, forest River in district of Western and Eastern Damai Damai, Prosperous Gulf Coast region in district and Lake Kampai Phoebe Flowers of seven in Eastern Damai. As the main gate to enter the Riau Mainland, some tourists have repeatedly visited the Dumai, especially those that like to visit Malacca. Dumai is very easily accessible due to good transportation connections. There are some interesting sights on the way to Dumai, such as the Sakai tribe, tropical forests along the River, and water colour is unique as the color of tea. Moreover, it also can be seen hundreds of bobbing oil who raised the pipe from the bowels of the Earth. Ramayana shopping center on General Sudirman street was opened in 2007. At night, a variety of Indonesian food is sold along Ombak street.
Dumai has some interesting places to be visit, among others:

 Teluk Makmur Beach
 Putri Tujuh Grave (Makam Putri Tujuh)
 Seascape of Dumai
 The Great Mosque of Al-Badar (Masjid Raya Al-Badar)
 Bunga Tujuh Lake
 Pelintung Cave (Goa Pelintung)
 Forest Tour of Dumai
 The Great Mosque of Dumai (Masjid Raya Dumai)
 Pawang Leon Grave (Makam Pawang Leon)
 Siti of Sea Grave (Makam Siti Laut)
 The Great Mosque of Al-Mannan (Masjid Raya Al-Mannan)
 Magic Footprint Tiger (Tapak Harimau Sakti)
 '''Tepak Sirih Monument (Tugu Tepak Sirih)

Sister Cities

References 

 
Populated places in Riau
Cities in Indonesia
1999 establishments in Indonesia
Cities in Riau